Bajram Begaj (born 20 March 1967) is an Albanian retired military officer and politician, who is currently serving as the 9th President of Albania since 24 July 2022. Having had a long career in the Albanian army, he served as the 26th Chief of General Staff of the Albanian Armed Forces from July 2020 to June 2022. Although he is politically independent, on 3 June 2022 Begaj was officially nominated by the governing Socialist Party as the candidate to the fourth round of the 2022 presidential election. Begaj is the fifth president in the history of Albania to have a military background, after Ahmet Zogu, Ramiz Alia, Alfred Moisiu and Bujar Nishani.

Early life and career
Begaj was born on 20 March 1967, in Rrogozhinë. He graduated from Tirana's Faculty of Medicine in 1989 and became an active medical officer in 1998. Having completed his professional doctorate degree, he holds the title "Associate Professor" in Medicine.

During his 31-year military career, Begaj has taken part in numerous training seminars and completed courses in Security and Defense, the Advanced Postgraduate School of Medicine, a Postgraduate Specialization in Gastrohepatology, a Hospital Management Course and Strategic Medical Leadership Course in the United States, a Specialization Course in Medicine and a Health Course in Greece.

Begaj previously served as the Commander of the Doctrine and Training Command in the Albanian Armed Forces. He held various other posts including: Chief of the Military Medical Unit and Deputy Military Director of SUT, Director of the Military Hospital, Director of the Health Inspectorate, etc. He was appointed Chief of the General Staff of the Albanian Armed Forces in July 2020 and assumed office later that month.

Presidency (2022–present) 
Begaj was elected by the parliament of Albania for the role of president on 4 June 2022, with 78 votes in favour, 4 against, and 1 abstention. 57 MPs from the opposition boycotted the vote, claiming the process of naming candidates was irregular. Begaj was sworn in on 24 July 2022.

Official visits

Personal life

Begaj is married to Armanda Begaj, with whom he has two sons, Dorian and Klajdi.

References

|-

1967 births
Living people
People from Rrogozhinë
Albanian generals
21st-century Albanian politicians
Presidents of Albania